The card game Gnau or Ngau or "Ngao" (British Chinese) meaning Ox in English (Cantonese: Ngau) is a card game played in Malaysia where it originated. It can be played casually or as a gambling game. It can be played with as many players as the number of cards allows.

Preparation
The game uses a standard 52-card deck, with thirteen cards in four suits. Extra decks may be used if many players are playing. One player volunteers to be the dealer. The dealer then shuffles the cards and distributes them in a clockwise or counterclockwise manner to all players, 5 cards for each. The extra cards are put aside.

Counting
The "Ox values" of the cards are as follows:
Ace = 1
2,4,5,7,8,9 = respective face values
10,J,Q,K = 10
3 = 3 or 6
6 = 3 or 6

The play
The objective of the game is identify 3 of the 5 cards that Ox values sum up to a multiple of 10, that is 10 or 20 or 30. If a player is able to do so, he is said to have an Ox. The other two cards show "how powerful" his Ox is. Because 3's and 6's are interchangeable, there may be more than one way to form an Ox. The player should choose a way that makes the Ox most powerful.

Ranking of Oxen
Here shows the ranking of oxen from lowest to highest:
No Ox: Player is unable to form an Ox, that is no 3 cards sums up to multiple of 10.
Ordinary Ox: ranked by the sum of the other 2 cards (if the sum is greater than 10, take the remainder after subtraction of 10)
Double Ox: if the other 2 cards are equal in face values (not Ox values). ranked by the face value of the double.
Ngau Tonku: if the other 2 cards having Ace spade & picture (J,Q,K). If the Ace is others, that is called nenku and only count as 1.
Five Dukes: if all five cards have values 10.

Hierarchy of Oxen

 5 Dukes
 Ngau Ton Ku (Ace Spade + Duke)
 Double-Ox K
 Double-Ox Q
 Double-Ox J
 Double-Ox 10
 Double-Ox 9
 Double-Ox 8
 Double-Ox 7
 Double-Ox 6 (3 can be changed to 6 & can be inter-paired, if designated)
 Double-Ox 5
 Double-Ox 4
 Double-Ox 3 (3 can be changed to 6 & can be inter-paired, if designated)
 Double-Ox 2
 Double-Ox Ace
 Ox of 9
 Ox of 8
 Ox of 7
 Ox of 6
 Ox of 5
 Ox of 4
 Ox of 3
 Ox of 2
 Ox of 1
 PS1:- Note that a Duke can be designated to include 10 or picture only card.
 PS2:- Note that house rule may allow suited OX to have a double payout.

Payout

 5 Dukes = 7 times
 Ngau Ton Ku = 5 times
 Double-Ox = 3 times
 Standard Ox = 1 time

Scoring
No Ox: 0 pt.
Ordinary Ox: 1 pt.
Double Ox: 2 pts.
Ngau Tonku : 5 pts (triple pay)
Five Dukes: 10 pts.

The players play with the dealer and not among each other. So if your Ox cannot beat the dealer's Ox, the dealer will deduct the number of pts the dealer's Ox worths from you and add to his/her total. Vice-Versa. If both own Five Dukes, it's a tie.

Example play
If one gets cards with face values 3,6,8,4,8
Three ways to form an Ox:
 3(counted as 6) + 6 + 8 = 20, 4 + 8 = 2 (take remainder)
 3 + 6(counted as 3) + 4 = 10, 8 + 8 = Double-Ox Eight
 8 + 4 + 8 = 20, 3 + 6 = 9

If one gets cards with face values 6,4,J,9,9
It's a Double-9 Ox.

If one gets cards with face values 10,J,Q,Q,K
It's a Five Dukes.

See also
Zi pai
Bashi Fen 
Four Color Cards

Chinese card games